Émilienne d'Alençon (17 July 1870 – 14 February 1945) was a French dancer, actress, and courtesan.

Biography

Born in Paris, d'Alençon made her début at the Cirque d'été in 1889 before appearing at the Casino de Paris, Menus-Plaisirs, Folies Bergère, Paris Scala and the Théâtre des Variétés. 

Among her earlier shows were Paris Boulevards, Vénus d'Arles and Que d'eau Que d'eau. She appeared in La Belle et la Bête at the Folies Bergères and she danced in the ballet The Red Slippers in London. She also performed as a dancer at the Paris Olympia in Faust and Grand Ballet Féerie. In 1892, she came on stage as a snake dancer.

Renowned as a courtesan, she was involved in a number of affairs including one with the industrialist Étienne Balsan. In 1895, she married the jockey Percy Woodland. 
Émilienne d'Alençon left the stage in 1906 and invested in horse racing. After losing her fortune on drugs and gambling in 1931, she was forced to sell her property and lavish furniture. She died in Monaco on 14 February 1945 and was buried at the Batignolles cemetery in Paris, in the mausoleum of her maternal family, the Normand chapel.

In popular culture
She was portrayed by Karen Black in Chanel Solitaire and by Emmanuelle Devos in Coco Before Chanel.

See also
Women in dance

References

2. Chéri film.

Literature
 Auriant (pseud. d'Alexandre Hadjivassiliou). Émilienne d'Alençon. Bruxelles: Éditions de la nouvelle revue belgique, 1942
 Ochaim B., Balk C.: Varieté-Tänzerinnen um 1900. Vom Sinnenrausch zur Tanzmoderne, Ausstellung des Deutschen Theatermuseums München 23. Oktober 1998 – 17. Januar 1999., Stroemfeld, Frankfurt/M. 1998, 
 Dufresne Cl. Trois grâces de la Belle Epoque. Paris: Bartillat, 2003

1869 births
1946 deaths
French female dancers
French vedettes
Actresses from Paris
Burials at Batignolles Cemetery
Courtesans from Paris
Dancers from Paris